Whitney Myers Burnett (born September 8, 1984) is an American former competition swimmer.  She swam for the University of Arizona.  She won a gold medal at the 2006 Pan-Pacific championships in Victoria, British Columbia, in the 200-meter individual medley, just out-touching teammate Katie Hoff.

She was featured on the cover of the March 2007 issue of Swimming World Magazine.

She swam for Ursuline Academy in Cincinnati, Ohio, for her high school career

"Whitney Myers, a record-setting swimmer and diver at the University of Arizona, was named the NCAA Woman of the Year. The award recognizes outstanding female student-athletes who have excelled in athletics, academics, leadership and service. Myers was selected from 128 nominees representing all three NCAA divisions. Myers is a 14-time record-holder at Arizona, earning her the 2006 Pac-10 Swimmer of the Year award. She was the 2007 NCAA Champion in the 200 individual medley (1:54.89), and tallied a total of six first team All-American honors at the championships. Myers has been on the dean’s list every semester and volunteers with local Girl Scout troops and in elementary schools."-University of Arizona (2007)

See also
 List of World Aquatics Championships medalists in swimming (women)

References

External links
 
 
 
 Myers Swimming History

1984 births
Living people
American female freestyle swimmers
Arizona Wildcats women's swimmers
People from Oxford, Ohio
Swimmers at the 2011 Pan American Games
World Aquatics Championships medalists in swimming
Pan American Games competitors for the United States